Kyriamadi or Kereamathi has a double sense. Geographically it is the middle peninsula of Cape Sideros in the northeast of Crete. Small landbridges connect it on the one hand to the Itanos promontory of mainland Crete to the southwest, and on the other hand the outermost peninsula Sideros to the northeast. In the Sea of Crete just offshore to the west are two small insular structures, the Kyriamadi "islands" (hydrologically smaller than professionally defined islands), which must take their name from the peninsula.

On the west of the northeastern landbridge is the Bay of Kyriamadi, after which the naval station is named, which is actually on Sideros. Similarly, "Kyriamadi Nature Park," a part of Sitia Geopark, sometimes marked as being on Sideros next to the Bay of Kyriamadi, is actually entirely on Kyriamadi. Administratively Kyriamadi is in Itanos municipal unit, Sitia municipality of Lasithi regional unit, Crete region.

References

External links

 Photographs of the cape

Populated places in Lasithi
Landforms of Lasithi 
Landforms of Crete
Peninsulas of Greece